Parliamentary elections were held in the Kingdom of Serbs, Croats and Slovenes on 8 February 1925. The People's Radical Party remained the largest faction in National Assembly, winning 123 of the 315 seats, with Nikola Pašić remaining Prime Minister.

Results

Aftermath
In April 1926, faced with a series of corruption scandals Prime Minister Nikola Pašić was forced to resign. A member of Pašić's party Nikola Uzunović became the new Prime Minister of Yugoslavia on 8 April 1926, however faced with internal conflict within the party, a succession of short term governments, came and went under his watch. 

In April 1927 Uzunović resigned from the office of Prime Minister, after the Croatian Peasant Party decided to leave his government. He was replaced by Velimir Vukićević, who was also a member of People's Radical Party.

References

External links
Nebojša A. Popović, Srpske parlamentarne stranke u Kraljevini SHS 1918-1929
 Branko Petranović, Momčilo Zečević, Jugoslavija 1918-1988. Tematska zbirka dokumenata, p. 228

Yugoslavia
Parliamentary election
Elections in Yugoslavia
February 1925 events
Election and referendum articles with incomplete results